Cartosat-2A is an Earth observation satellite in a Sun-synchronous orbit and the third of the Cartosat series of satellites. The satellite is the thirteenth satellite in the Indian Remote Sensing (IRS) satellite series to be built, launched by the Indian Space Research Organisation.

Launch 
It was launched by the Polar Satellite Launch Vehicle (PSLV-C9) on 28 April 2008, «t 03:54:00 UTC, along with the 87 kg Indian Mini Satellite (IMS-1) and eight nano research satellites belonging to research facilities. The CanX-2 and the CanX-6 of Canada, the AAUSAT-2 of Denmark, the Compass-1 and the Rubin-8 of Germany, the CUTE-1.7 of Japan, and the Delfi-C3 of the Netherlands.

IMS-1 satellite 
The IMS-1 satellite is a Ministry of Defence mission for the Government of India. It is a dedicated satellite for the Indian Armed Forces (IAF) which is in the process of establishing an Aerospace Command.

Payload 
The satellite carries a panchromatic (PAN) camera capable of taking black-and-white pictures in the visible region of electromagnetic spectrum. The highly agile Cartosat-2A can be steered up to 45° along as well as across the direction of its movement to facilitate imaging of any area more frequently. The satellite's health is continuously monitored from the Spacecraft Control Centre at Bangalore with the help of ISRO Telemetry, Tracking and Command Network (ISTRAC) of stations at Bangalore, Lucknow, Mauritius, Bearslake in Russia, Biak in Indonesia and Svalbard in Norway.

See also 

 Indian military satellites
 List of Indian satellites

References

External links 
 Cartosat-2A website

Cartosat
Spacecraft launched in 2008
Spacecraft launched by PSLV rockets